Jesús Manuel Ignacio López Villarreal (born 20 October 1958) is a Mexican engineer and politician affiliated with the National Action Party. He served as Deputy of the LIX Legislature of the Mexican Congress as a plurinominal representative. He also was municipal president of Saltillo from 1997 to 1999.

See also 
 List of presidents of Saltillo Municipality

References

1958 births
Living people
Politicians from Saltillo
Municipal presidents in Coahuila
Members of the Chamber of Deputies (Mexico)
National Action Party (Mexico) politicians
20th-century Mexican politicians
Monterrey Institute of Technology and Higher Education alumni
St. Edward's University alumni
21st-century Mexican politicians
Mexican engineers
Deputies of the LIX Legislature of Mexico